Thalassophorus is a genus of flies belonging to the family Dolichopodidae. It is known from Japan and North America.

Species
Two species are included in the genus:
 Thalassophorus arnaudi Brooks & Cumming, 2011 – British Columbia, Oregon, California
 Thalassophorus spinipennis Saigusa, 1986 – Japan

References

Parathalassiinae
Dolichopodidae genera
Diptera of Asia
Diptera of North America